The Sycuan Band of the Kumeyaay Nation is a federally recognized tribe of Mission Indians from Southern California, located in an unincorporated area of San Diego County just east of El Cajon. The Sycuan band are a Kumeyaay tribe, one of the four ethnic groups indigenous to San Diego County.

Reservation and administration

The nearest outside communities are the unincorporated communities of Dehesa, Harbison Canyon and Crest.

Cody Martinez is their current tribal chairman.

The band operates two waste water treatment plants, a sequencing batch reactor used for their casino, administrative buildings, and maintenance buildings. They also operate and own a modular treatment plant in a flood plain near one of their residential areas. The tribe operates a water treatment facility which controls their nitrate levels. Additionally, the tribe operates a small medical clinic, dental office, fire department and tribal police force. In 2005, they eliminated their environmental department for political and economic reasons.  In 2004, they installed a new air conditioning system, internal control systems, and a new parking lot.

Economic development
The move toward casino gaming on the Sycuan Band reservation was spearheaded by the Sycuan Band's former chairwoman, Anna Prieto Sandoval. The Sycuan Band opened its first gambling facility, the Sycuan Bingo Palace, on their reservation in 1983. As a direct evolution from that successful venture, they now run a profitable casino, as well as an off-reservation golf course. The Sycuan band is not the only San Diego-area band to operate significant commercial enterprises off-reservation.

The Sycuan band purchased the downtown San Diego landmark U. S. Grant Hotel in 2003. It also advertises heavily in relation to the San Diego Padres major-league baseball team (including both television and radio commercials during game broadcasts, and posted advertising at Petco Park, the team's home field).

Hotel casino resort expansion

A $226 million hotel casino expansion opened to the public on March 27, 2019. The casino has a total of 2800 slot machines and 80 gaming tables (blackjack, poker, etc).

Sycuan Institute on Tribal Gaming

The Sycuan band also provides an endowment to support the Sycuan Institute on Tribal Gaming, a research institute at San Diego State University.

Education
The Kumeyaay Community College was created by the Sycuan Band to serve the Kumeyaay-Diegueño Nation, and describes its mission as "to support cultural identity, sovereignty, and self-determination while meeting the needs of native and non-Native students."  In addition, the reservation is served by the Dehesa Elementary School District and Grossmont Union High School District.

See also
Kumeyaay
 Sycuan Institute on Tribal Gaming
 Mission Indians

Notes

References
 Eargle, Jr., Dolan H. Northern California Guide: Weaving the Past and Present. San Francisco: Tree Company Press, 2000. .
 Pritzker, Barry M. A Native American Encyclopedia: History, Culture, and Peoples. Oxford: Oxford University Press, 2000. .

External links
 Sycuan Tribe official homepage
 Sycuan Casino official homepage
 Singing Hills Golf Resort at Sycuan official homepage
 Elicit Lounge homepage
 

Kumeyaay
California Mission Indians
Native American tribes in San Diego County, California
Native American tribes in California
Federally recognized tribes in the United States